Andrew Nicol may refer to:

Andy Nicol (born 1971), Scottish rugby union player
Andrew Nicol (judge) (born 1951), British judge
Andrew Niccol (born 1964), New Zealand screenwriter
Andrew Nicholl (1804–1886), New Zealand screenwriter
Andy Nicholls (born 1962), English football hooligan